The 1954–55 San Francisco Dons men's basketball team represented the University of San Francisco in NCAA competition in the 1954–55 season. The Dons, a member of the California Basketball Association (now known as the West Coast Conference), finished the season ranked #1 in the nation.

Roster

Schedule and results

|-
!colspan=9 style=| Regular Season

|-
!colspan=9 style=| NCAA Tournament

Rankings

Awards and honors
Bill Russell, First Team All-America selection

Team players drafted into the NBA

References

San Francisco
San Francisco Dons men's basketball seasons
NCAA Division I men's basketball tournament Final Four seasons
San Francisco
NCAA Division I men's basketball tournament championship seasons
San Francisco Dons
San Francisco Dons